Marco Iannascoli (born 6 November 1994) is an Italian footballer who plays for Italian Promozione side Penne.

Biography
Born in Pescara, Italy, Iannascoli started his career at Pescara. He was a player of the under-13 team in 2006–07 season, as well as the under-15 team in 2008–09 season. He made his Serie A debut in the second last round of 2012–13 Serie A season.

On 19 July 2013 Iannascoli and Riccardo Ragni were signed by Aprilia in a temporary deal. Since July 2015 Iannascoli was a player of L'Aquila.

After spells at US Levico Terme, ASD Monticelli, Olympia Agnonese and Penne, Iannascoli joined ASD Castelnuovo Vomano in June 2019. However, he returned to Penne in August 2020. In July 2021, Iannascoli joined Hatria Calcio 1957.

References

External links
 AIC profile (data by football.it) 
 
 Marco Iannascoli at TuttoCampo

1994 births
Living people
Italian footballers
Association football midfielders
Sportspeople from Pescara
Footballers from Abruzzo
Delfino Pescara 1936 players
F.C. Aprilia Racing Club players
S.S. Ischia Isolaverde players
L'Aquila Calcio 1927 players
Pol. Olympia Agnonese players
Serie A players
Serie C players
Serie D players